This is a list of events in Scottish television from 1984.

Events

January
No events.

February
No events.

March
No events.

April
20 April – 20th anniversary of BBC Two Scotland.

May
No events.

June
1 June – The final edition of current affairs series Agenda is broadcast on BBC1 Scotland. It had been on air for less than three years.

July
27 July – The final edition of Sixty Minutes is broadcast on BBC1, ending less than a year after it first went on air. Consequently, Scotland Sixty Minutes ends.
30 July – To fill the gap between the end of Sixty Minutes and the launch of BBC1's teatime news hour, BBC Scotland's regional news programme is broadcast for 20 minutes, beginning at 5.55pm, and the change sees the return of the Reporting Scotland name.

August
No events.

September
3 September – BBC1's teatime news hour is relaunched and now runs from 6pm until 7pm. The change results in Reporting Scotland moving to a new time of 6.35pm and the programme's length is extended to 25 minutes.

October
 8 October – Scotland Today is relaunched as a features-led magazine format with the news relegated to brief summaries before and after the programme.

November
No events.

December
No events.

Unknown
Unknown – Debut of the Grampian Television current affairs programme Crossfire.
Unknown – Scottish airs Scotland's Story, a 24-part series on the history of Scotland.

Debuts

BBC
Unknown – City Lights (1984–1991)

ITV
Unknown – Crossfire on Grampian (1984–2004)

Returning this year
30 July – Reporting Scotland (1968–1983; 1984–present)

Television series
Scotsport (1957–2008)
Top Club (1971–1998)
Scotland Today (1972–2009)
Sportscene (1975–present)
The Beechgrove Garden (1978–present)
Grampian Today (1980–2009)
Take the High Road (1980–2003)
Now You See It (1981–1986)

Births
16 February – Kari Corbett, actor
18 December – Tiffany Mulheron, actress

Deaths
4 January – Jameson Clark, 76, actor
6 September – Donny MacLeod, 52, television presenter

See also
1984 in Scotland

References

 
Television in Scotland by year
1980s in Scottish television